The Baden Open is a professional tennis tournament played on outdoor red clay courts. It is currently part of the Association of Tennis Professionals (ATP) Challenger Tour. It is held annually in Karlsruhe, Germany, since 1998 (as a club event from 1998 to 1999, as a Futures from 2000 to 2003, as a Challenger since 2005).

Past finals

Singles

Doubles

External links
Official website
ITF search

ATP Challenger Tour
Clay court tennis tournaments
Tennis tournaments in Germany
Sport in Karlsruhe
Recurring sporting events established in 1998
1998 establishments in Germany